Troglohyphantes iulianae is a species of cave spider of the family Linyphiidae.

Morphology 
Troglohyphantes iulianae  is a small sized spider, with a body length of ca. 3mm.

Distribution 
Epigean species, occasionally found in caves. The Italian distribution ranges from the South-western Alps to the Apuan Alps (Tuscany).

References 

Linyphiidae
Spiders of Europe
Spiders described in 1971